is an opera by the French composer Louis Lacoste, first performed at the Académie Royale de Musique (the Paris Opera) on 20 October 1705. It takes the form of a tragédie en musique in a prologue and five acts. The libretto, by Pierre-Charles Roy, is based on the story of Philomela as told in Ovid's Metamorphoses.

Sources
 Libretto at "Livrets baroques"
 Félix Clément and Pierre Larousse Dictionnaire des Opéras, Paris, 1881, page 530

French-language operas
Tragédies en musique
Operas by Louis Lacoste
Operas
1705 operas
Operas based on Metamorphoses